The 1939 San Diego State Aztecs football team represented San Diego State College during the 1939 college football season.

San Diego State competed in the inaugural season of the California Collegiate Athletic Association (CCAA). They had competed in the Southern California Intercollegiate Athletic Conference (SCIAC) for the previous 13 years. The 1939 team was led by head coach Leo B. Calland in his fifth season with the Aztecs. They played home games at Aztec Bowl in San Diego, California. The Aztecs finished the season with two wins and seven losses (2–7, 0–2 CCAA). Overall, the team was outscored by its opponents 60–148 for the season.

Schedule

Team players in the NFL
No San Diego State players were selected in the 1940 NFL Draft.

Notes

References

San Diego State
San Diego State Aztecs football seasons
San Diego State Aztecs football